Ngatendo is of one of the Reef Islands located in Temotu Province of the Solomon Islands. The island is inhabited.

References

Islands of the Solomon Islands
Polynesian outliers